La Tauromaquia (Bullfighting) is a series of 33 prints created by the Spanish painter and printmaker Francisco Goya, which was published in 1816. The works of the series depict bullfighting scenes. There are also seven extra prints that were not published in the original edition.

Background

Goya created Tauromaquia between 1815 and 1816, at the age of 69, during a break from his famous series The Disasters of War. The Disasters of War and the Caprichos, the series he had created previously, served as visual criticism on subjects concerning war, superstition, and contemporary Spanish society generally, including anticlerical scenes. Because of their sensitive subjects, few people had seen these works during Goya's lifetime.

Bullfighting was not politically sensitive, and the series was published at the end of 1816 in an edition of 320—for sale individually or in sets—without incident. It did not meet with critical or commercial success. Goya was always charmed by bullfighting, a theme that obviously inspired him, since it was the subject of many of his works: in a self-portrait (c 1790-95) he depicted himself in a bullfighter's suit; in 1793 he completed a series of eight paintings on tinplate, created for the Royal Academy of Fine Arts of San Fernando, which depicted scenes from bulls' lives from the moment of their birth to the time they enter the bullring; in 1825 he made the series Los toros de Burdeos (The Bulls of Bordeaux) (1825), of which Delacroix purchased a copy. Indicative of his love for bulls is the fact that he signed one of his letters as Francisco de los Toros (Francisco of the Bulls).

The works
Goya used mainly the techniques of etching and aquatint in this series. The artist focuses on the violent scenes that take place in the bullring and the daring movements of the bullfighters. The events are not presented as they are viewed by a viewer in the stands, but in a more direct way, in contrast with The Bulls of Bordeaux where the events are presented as a means of popular entertainment.

Interpretations 
Janis Tomlinson, an internationally recognized art historian and Goya scholar,  recognizes that in plate No. 33, "[t]he eventually published title, identifies the bull fighter as Pepe Illo. A fighter who met end in the ring of Madrid in May 1801". The name, Pepe, is a diminutive for the name Joseph. It is interpreted that Pepe represents Joseph Bonaparte, the former king of Spain.

Works

Unpublished prints

See also
List of works by Francisco Goya

References

External links
www.museodelprado.es - Goya en el Prado, Tauromaquia
National Gallery of Art, Washington

19th-century etchings
1810s prints
Prints by Francisco Goya
Bullfighting in art